Talfourd is a surname. Notable people with the surname include:

Francis Talfourd (1828–1862), English lawyer and dramatist, son of Thomas
Sir Thomas Noon Talfourd (1795–1854), English judge, politician, and writer

English-language surnames